Selca may refer to:

Geography

Croatia
 Selca, Brač, a municipality on the island of Brač, Croatia
 Selca, Istria County, a village in the municipality of Buzet, Croatia
 Selca kod Bogomolja, a village on the island of Hvar, Croatia, and an Italian exonym in Dalmatia
 Selca kod Starog Grada, a village on the island of Hvar, Croatia

Slovenia
 Selca, Slovenia, a village in the Municipality of Železniki, Slovenia
 Selca, Železniki, Slovenia
 Selca Valley, Slovenia, including the town of Železniki
 Selca Sora river, a source of the Sora (river) river, western Slovenia

Linguistics
 Selca dialect, a Slovene dialect

Biology
 Selca (moth), a genus of moths in subfamily Nolinae

See also
 Selce (disambiguation)
 Selci (disambiguation)
 Seoca (disambiguation)
 Seoce (disambiguation)